Peniophora sacrata is a species of fungus in the family Peniophoraceae. A plant pathogen, the fungus causes Peniophora root and stem canker  on apple trees.

See also
 List of apple diseases

References

Fungi described in 1955
Fungi of New Zealand
Fungal tree pathogens and diseases
Apple tree diseases
Russulales
Taxa named by Gordon Herriot Cunningham